Prisma Health Richland Hospital is a hospital in Columbia, South Carolina that is part of Prisma Health.

Prisma Health Richland hospital was originally established in 1892 as Columbia Hospital and was one of the first hospitals in the city.  Over the years, with the growth of Columbia and the arrival of Fort Jackson, the hospital expanded.  It outgrew its original location on Harden St. by the 1960s.  Later renamed Richland Memorial Hospital it is moved in 1972 to its present location near the intersection of Bull St. and Harden St. Extension.

Today, Prisma Health Richland is one of the largest hospitals in the state with over 20 specialties. It is affiliated with the University of South Carolina, training future doctors, nurses, and pharmacists.  It is the regional referral center for the Midlands of South Carolina and is the site of the Carolinas' first Gamma Knife Center. The hospital also has a Total Joint Center for hip and knee replacements and, since 2007, a Robotic Surgery Center specializing in minimally invasive surgery.

Prisma Health Heart Hospital
In January 2006, the 124 inpatient bed Prisma Health Heart Hospital, located on the Richland campus, opened its doors. The $80 million,  hospital is the state's only freestanding facility specializing only in the prevention, diagnosis and treatment of cardiovascular diseases.

LifeNet South Carolina
The Palmetto Richland was home to CareForce, an emergency and critical-care-transport air ambulance service, founded in 1998.  It had two helicopter in its fleet, a Bell 230 owned by Palmetto Health and a Bell 206 shared by Bamberg Memorial Hospital in Bamberg and Clarendon County Memorial Hospital in Manning.

On May 1, 2007, CareForce merged with Life Reach, which provided services to the Providence Heart Institute, a hospital of the Sisters of Charity Ministry.

References

External links
 Prisma Health's Website

Hospital buildings completed in 1892
Hospital buildings completed in 1972
Teaching hospitals in South Carolina
Prisma Health
University of South Carolina
Companies based in Columbia, South Carolina